Bucillamine is an antirheumatic agent developed from tiopronin. Activity is mediated by the two thiol groups that the molecule contains. Research done in USA showed positive transplant preservation properties. Bucillamine is currently being investigated for COVID-19 drug repurposing.  

Bucillamine has a well-known safety profile and is prescribed in the treatment of rheumatoid arthritis in Japan and South Korea for over 30 years. It is a cysteine derivative with 2 thiol groups that is 16-fold more potent than acetylcysteine (NAC) as a thiol donor in vivo, giving it vastly superior function in restoring glutathione and therefore greater potential to prevent acute lung injury during influenza infection. Bucillamine has also been shown to prevent oxidative and reperfusion injury in heart and liver tissues.

Bucillamine has both proven safety and proven mechanism of action similar to that of NAC, but with much higher potency, mitigating the previous obstacles to using thiols therapeutically. It is hypothesized that similar processes related to reactive oxygen species (ROS) are involved in acute lung injury during nCov-19 infection, possibly justifying the investigation of bucillamine as an intervention for COVID-19.

On July 31st, 2020, the U.S. Food & Drug Administration (FDA) has approved Revive Therapeutics Ltd. to proceed with a randomized, double-blind, placebo-controlled confirmatory Phase 3 clinical trial protocol to evaluate the safety and efficacy of Bucillamine in patients with mild-moderate COVID-19.

References

Antirheumatic products
Carboxylic acids
Propionamides
Thiols